Trachylepis albotaeniata, the Pemba Island mabuya, is a species of skink found on Pemba Island in Tanzania.

References

Trachylepis
Reptiles of Tanzania
Reptiles described in 1913
Taxa named by Oskar Boettger